Juaben Senior High School, also known as Juaben SHS, formerly Juaben Secondary School, is a co-educational senior high school in Juaben, a town in the Ejisu-Juaben District of the Ashanti Region in Ghana.

History
The school opened with the name Juaben Secondary School in November 1972, starting with 87 students. It had originally been opened in 1950 as a model Girl's Basic School, and was converted to a Women's Training College in October, 1962.

In 2020, the school won a computing competition for senior high schools in the Ashanti Region called Code Afrique, which had been organised by Cornell University and Kwame Nkrumah University of Science and Technology.

Operations
The school is under the Ghana Education Service of the government of Ghana. The school is located in Ashanti Juaben in the Ejisu Juaben Municipality, about 30 km from Kumasi and about 8 km from Ejisu.

The school has about 3861 students, a teaching staff of about 152 and non-teaching staff of around 99 making it 251 staff members.

It has a boarding facility for its students. The school has about 2979 boarders with some 882 day students.

The school offers programmes in general agriculture, general arts, general science, home economics and the visual arts.

The school has 8 houses with each having about 482 students; the houses are Nana Adarkwa Yiadom, Bishop Asante Antwi, Nana Yaw Sarpong II, Nana Otuo Serebour II for boys and Danielles Ghartey, Sussana Wesley, Rose E. Coker, and Nana Akosua Akyaama II.
The school has over the years chocked up a lot of successes in both academics and co-curricular activities in the area of sports, debate, drama, etc.

Notable alumni
 John Amponsah, javelin thrower
 Joseph Osei Owusu, lawyer, MP for Bekwai constituency
 Nana Appiagyei Dankawoso, vice president Ghana Chamber of commerce, Board Member University of Cape Business School
 Charles Kwadwo Fosu, aka Daddy Lumba, musician
 Kwame Sarpong Appiah, PhD, Researcher at Tokyo University of Agriculture and Technology
 Morgan Carter, event organizer

References

See also

 Education in Ghana
 List of senior high schools in the Ashanti Region

Educational institutions established in 1972
1972 establishments in Ghana
Ashanti Region
Co-educational boarding schools
High schools in Ghana